William Henry Roberts (1 September 1795 – 4 October 1843) was an English first-class cricketer who is recorded in two matches for Old Etonians, totalling 36 runs with a highest score of 22 and taking 5 wickets. He died in Lambeth, London.

References

Bibliography
 

English cricketers
English cricketers of 1787 to 1825
1795 births
1843 deaths
Old Etonians cricketers